Rubus calycinoides is a flowering plant in the rose family (Rosaceae) native to Asia from the Himilayas to Myanmar. It was described by Otto Kunze in 1879.

Taxonomy
The botanical name Rubus calycinoides can be misleading, as the name was separately published to refer to two distinct species. R. calycinoides, as described by Bunzo Hayata and Gen-ichi Koidzumi in 1913, is now considered a taxonomic synonym of Rubus rolfei.

References

calycinoides
Flora of Asia